Mary Sue Price is an American playwright and scriptwriter for the ABC Daytime soap opera General Hospital.  She has won two Emmys as a member of the General Hospital writing team.

Education
Price holds an undergraduate degree from New York University and an MFA in Dramatic Writing from NYU.

Positions held
Another World
Scriptwriter: 1997 - 1999

As the World Turns
Scriptwriter: 1997

General Hospital (hired by Robert Guza Jr.)
Screenwriter: 1999 - December 24, 2007; March 14, 2008 - September 9, 2012)

Plays
Back In Jesus Days
That Midnight Rodeo
Streets of Gold
Running Quarter Horses

Awards and nominations
Price has been nominated for six Daytime Emmy Awards (won twice) and 2 Writers Guild of America Awards.

See also
History of General Hospital
List of General Hospital characters

References

External links
 ABC Daytime: GH

American soap opera writers
American women television writers
American screenwriters
Year of birth missing (living people)
Living people
Daytime Emmy Award winners
New York University alumni
American women screenwriters
Place of birth missing (living people)
Women soap opera writers